The Women's omnium at the 2012 UEC European Track Championships was held on 20–21 October 2012. 10 riders participated.

Medalists

Results

Overall results
After six events.

Flying lap
It was held at 12:15.

Points race
It was held at 13:54.

Elimination race
It was held at 20:34.

Individual pursuit
It was held at 10:00.

Scratch race
It was held at 12:01.

500m time trial
It was held at 17:10.

References

Women's omnium
European Track Championships – Women's omnium